Bose is a lunar impact crater that is located on the far side of the Moon, in the southern sphere hemisphere. It lies just to the northwest of the smaller crater Bhabha, and southeast of Alder.

The outer rim of Bose has become worn and the edges rounded by impacts, although the shape of the wall is still well-preserved. The small satellite crater Bose D lies across the east-northeastern rim, and a smaller craterlet has impacted on the inner southeast wall. The inner floor is level with a low central peak offset slightly to the southeast of the midpoint. There are several tiny craterlets marking the interior, including three to the east of the central peak.

The crater is named after an eminent Indian polymath, Sir Jagadish Chandra Bose, for his works on wireless communication.

Satellite craters
By convention these features are identified in selenography by placing the letter on the side of the crater midpoint that is closest to Bose.

See also
 Mitra (crater)

References

 
 
 
 
 
 
 
 
 
 
 
 

Impact craters on the Moon